Kaii is a Japanese given name. People with this name include:

, Japanese artist
, Chinese-born Japanese table tennis player

Japanese masculine given names